The Josephine Falls is a tiered cascade waterfall on the Josephine Creek located in Wooroonooran, Cairns Region in the Far North region of Queensland, Australia.

Location and features
The falls are situated at the foot of the southern face of Mount Bartle Frere in Wooroonooran National Park.

Access to falls is via a sealed road off the Bruce Highway between Babinda and Innisfail. The natural rock slide can be dangerous and the occasional flash flooding occurs without warning, with a sudden increase in the water volume.

See also

 List of waterfalls of Queensland

References

External links 

  

Waterfalls of Far North Queensland
Cascade waterfalls
Tiered waterfalls

Cairns Region
Cassowary Coast Region
Tablelands Region